The 2008 Donington Park Superleague Formula round was the inaugural round of the Superleague Formula championship, with the races taking place on 31 August 2008. Seventeen football teams were represented on the grid, with a win each for Beijing Guoan and Sevilla FC.

Report

Qualifying
The first ever qualifying session for Superleague saw the introduction of a new qualifying system. Following a random draw which split the seventeen-car field into two groups, the fastest four qualifiers from each progressed into the knockout stages to decide places 1 to 8 on the grid. This meant that in Group B, fifth placed Al Ain (Andreas Zuber) and sixth placed Borussia Dortmund (Nelson Philippe) would both miss out on qualifying for the knockout stages, despite recording a time some four tenths of a second faster than fourth-placed Group A qualifier Galatasaray S.K. (Alessandro Pier Guidi). After negotiating their way through the knockout stages, Sevilla FC (Borja García) and Beijing Guoan (Davide Rigon) would meet in the final. In the one-lap shootout, Rigon came out on top by 0.822 seconds and would become Superleague's inaugural pole-sitter.

Race 1
The race began with a rolling start, to eradicate a potential chink in the 750 bhp car's armour, and would also delay the introduction of pitstops until the next round. From the start, the Olympiacos car of Kasper Andersen got a fantastic run from fourth on the grid, and was alongside Rigon as the grid headed for Redgate. However, he ran wide and fell back to fourth behind García and a fast-starting Yelmer Buurman in the PSV Eindhoven car. This would become fifth by the end of the lap, as Duncan Tappy also got by, in the Tottenham Hotspur machine. The safety car was deployed on lap three, as A.C. Milan and CR Flamengo had both gone off at Coppice with engine failures on the first and third laps respectively. There were further problems down the field with a midfield incident between Philippe and Andy Soucek in the SC Corinthians car and both would later retire from the race. Enrico Toccacelo would also become a factor in the race, having started sixth in the A.S. Roma car, moving up to third which became second, as García had to shift to manual gear-shifting after developing a problem on down-shifts. Toccacelo did get to within a second and a half of Rigon, but the Italian in the Chinese team's car would hold on, to be the first race-winner of the series. Toccacelo finished 2nd, while Tappy just held off Buurman for the final podium spot. Star of the race though, fell to Adrián Vallés. Having missed qualifying due to an electrical problem, the Liverpool F.C. car charged through from 17th on the grid, to finish fifth ahead of the other finishers Zuber, Tristan Gommendy (F.C. Porto), Ryan Dalziel (Rangers F.C.), Max Wissel (FC Basel 1893) and the troubled García. Of the seven retirees, six were down to technical problems.

Race 2
A storm engulfed the track, before the start of race two. With the reverse grid system in use, A.C. Milan were expected to start on pole, but did not start due to the fuel-system failure that took Robert Doornbos out of the first race. This put Flamengo on the pole, and would give Tuka Rocha an advantage at the start of the race. Rocha sped away into the distance as all hell broke loose behind. Zuber would go off at the Old Hairpin, who would later deploy the safety car and Philippe, who had challenged Rocha at Redgate, spun down to fifth at Coppice, letting Pier Guidi, Wissel and García through. As quickly as the safety car had gone in, it was back out again after Dalziel and latterly Pier Guidi had both gone off at Hollywood and Wissel had run wide at Melbourne in the Basel car. This left García to charge down Rocha at a rate of knots, and with eight laps to go, caught and passed Rocha in the Melbourne Loop and scampered off to a 10.074-second victory over Rocha. The battle for the final podium spot was decided on lap twenty, when Philippe slid sideways and knocked on his pit-lane limiter which allowed Vallés, who started 12th on the grid into third and third in the championship. Tappy, Rigon, Wissel, Buurman, Gommendy, Toccacelo and Andersen completed the finishers as 11 of the 16 starters finished the race. Rigon's first and sixth allowed Beijing Guoan to be seven points clear of Tottenham and Liverpool in the standings.

Results

Qualifying
 In each group, the top four qualify for the quarter-finals.

Group A

Group B

Knockout stages

Grid

Race 1

Race 2

 Olympiacos CFP started from the pitlane.

Notes
 First race:  All teams and drivers 
 First pole (Driver): Davide Rigon
 First pole (Team): Beijing Guoan
 First win (Driver): Davide Rigon & Borja García
 Last win (Driver): Borja García
 First win (Team): Beijing Guoan & Sevilla FC
 First podium (Driver): Davide Rigon, Enrico Toccacelo, Duncan Tappy, Borja García, Tuka Rocha, Adrian Valles
 First podium (Team): Beijing Guoan, A.S. Roma, Tottenham Hotspur, Sevilla FC, CR Flamengo, Liverpool F.C. 
 Last podium (Driver): Enrico Toccacelo, Borja García, Tuka Rocha
 First fastest lap (Driver): Davide Rigon & Yelmer Buurman
 First fastest lap (Team): Beijing Guoan & PSV Eindhoven
 World Feed Commentators: Jonathan Green & Bruce Jouanny

References

External links
 Official results from the Superleague Formula website

Donington Park
Superleague Formula